David Schumacher (born 23 October 2001) is a German racing driver, son of former Formula One driver Ralf Schumacher, nephew of seven-time Formula One world champion Michael Schumacher, and cousin of reserve* Formula One driver Mick Schumacher, (*current reserve driver for the Mercedes AMG Formula One Team and McLaren - BBC Sport. Retrieved 15 December 2022). He competed in the 2022 Deutsche Tourenwagen Masters with Mercedes-AMG Team Winward.

Career

Karting career
Schumacher began karting at a young age, alongside his cousin Mick. From there he competed in multiple karting championships under his mother's maiden name Brinkmann. In 2017, David's last year in karts, he chose to race with the Schumacher name and finished as runner-up in the DKM Championship to Dennis Hauger in the senior class.

Lower formulae
In August 2017, it was announced that Schumacher would graduate to single-seaters, competing for his father's US Racing outfit in the 2018 ADAC Formula 4 Championship. In January 2018, he made his single-seater debut, contesting the Formula 4 UAE Championship with Rasgaira Motorsports Team from the second round onwards. Claiming three wins, Schumacher ended the season as vice-champion to Charles Weerts.

In ADAC Formula 4, Schumacher scored a consistent string of points finishes, with three 4th places being his best finishes, and ended the season 9th in the championship. His results translated into eight race wins in the Rookies' Cup and he claimed the title of rookie champion.

Euroformula Open Championship & Asian F3 Winter Series
Schumacher competed in the final two rounds of the 2018 Euroformula Open Championship with RP Motorsport. He was ineligible to score points as a guest driver, but claimed two 4th-place finishes at the Circuit de Barcelona-Catalunya. These results placed him 6th in the Spanish Formula 3 championship, which is made up of three rounds from the Euroformula Open championship.

In January 2019, Schumacher was named as part of Pinnacle Motorsport's three car line-up for the Asian F3 Winter Series. He competed in two of the championship's three rounds, taking a podium finish at the Buriram International Circuit and finishing 8th in the championship.

Formula Regional European Championship 
In March 2019 it was announced that Schumacher would compete in the inaugural season of the Formula Regional European Championship, returning to the US Racing team co-owned by his father. He claimed four race victories over the season, including two consecutively at the Circuit de Barcelona-Catalunya, as well as five other podium finishes, five pole positions and three fastest laps. He ended the season 4th in the championship.

FIA Formula 3 Championship

2019 
In September 2019 Schumacher made his debut in the FIA Formula 3 Championship, standing in at Campos Racing for the injured Alex Peroni at the final round in Sochi. Schumacher finished the two races in 22nd and 20th. Schumacher made his first appearance at the Macau Grand Prix in November, racing for Sauber Junior Team by Charouz. He placed 23rd in qualifying, fell back to 25th in the qualifying race and finished 21st in the main race. In December he took part in the second round of the MRF Challenge Formula 2000 series at Bahrain International Circuit, taking both pole positions of the weekend and finishing all four races on the podium, including a victory in the second race.

2020 
In February 2020 it was confirmed that Schumacher would return to the FIA Formula 3 Championship, racing full-time with Charouz Racing System. However, following the Spanish round, he left Charouz to join Carlin Racing. He did not score any points, had a best finish of 12th at the Austria feature race, and finished the championship in 28th place.

2021 

In February 2021 it was announced that Schumacher would race for Trident Racing in the 2021 season. On 4 July 2021 he achieved his first FIA F3 points, podium and victory in race 2 of the third round at the Red Bull Ring, having started the race from reverse-grid pole. Throughout the next two rounds, the German would go on to finish in the points in all but one race, even scoring his second podium of the year in the second race at Spa-Francorchamps, where him and teammate Jack Doohan gave Trident their first one-two finish in their Formula 3 history.
At Zandvoort, Schumacher qualified a career best of 2nd, behind Dennis Hauger. During the feature race,  with 3 laps to go, Schumacher was running in 2nd place until Victor Martins made a failed attempt to pass Schumacher, taking him out while trying to overtake him. Schumacher's 5th place the race before proved to be his last points finish during the season, as he finished 14th and 15th in the final round. He ended the season with just 55 points, compared to his teammates Doohan and Novalak with 179 and 147 points respectively. He still however, helped Trident clinch the constructors' championship by 4 points.

2022 
In April 2022 it was announced that Schumacher would return to Charouz Racing System, the team which he drove for in 2020, to replace Ayrton Simmons at the Imola round. He started 29th and last for both of the races, but recovered to finish 18th and 12th in the races. Due to DTM commitments, Schumacher was replaced by Lirim Zendeli for the Barcelona round. At Zandvoort, Schumacher made his second appearance of the season with Charouz, as Christian Mansell returned to his main campaign in the Euroformula Open. Schumacher once again returned to DTM that clashed with the Monza season finale and was replaced by Alessandro Famularo. Schumacher ended the championship 28th overall, highest of the non-scorers and even ahead of some full-timers.

Touring cars

2022 
He left Formula 3 at the conclusion of the 2021 season to join the Deutsche Tourenwagen Masters for its 2022 campaign. His season started in a promising manner, qualifying tenth at the Lausitzring and eventually finishing 14th, however a flurry of retirements as a result of crashes, most notably one with three-time DTM champion René Rast at the Nürburgring, led to criticism regarding the German's driving conduct. The best result of the season came at Spa-Francorchamps, where Schumacher ended up eleventh, a mere second behind the points positions, albeit that weekend also yielded a twelve-place grid penalty for Race 2 caused by multiple track limit infractions. At the final event, he was involved in a collision with Thomas Preining, which caused a fracture of Schumacher's lumbar vertebrae. The German ended the season in 28th place, having failed to score points, summing it up by stating that it "hadn't been a good season".

2023 
After a difficult debut season in the DTM, Schumacher began competing in the GT World Challenge Europe Endurance Cup. He competed for Winward Racing, driving alongside Marius Zug and Miklas Born.

Personal life
Schumacher's family includes his father, former Formula One driver Ralf, his uncle, seven-time Formula One world champion Michael, and his cousin, Formula One driver Mick. He is also in a relationship with Hungarian racing driver Vivien Keszthelyi.

Karting record

Karting career summary

Racing record

Racing career summary

† As Schumacher was a guest driver, he was ineligible for points.

Complete Formula 4 UAE Championship results 
(key) (Races in bold indicate pole position; races in italics indicate fastest lap)

Complete ADAC Formula 4 Championship results
(key) (Races in bold indicate pole position) (Races in italics indicate fastest lap)

Complete Formula Regional European Championship results 
(key) (Races in bold indicate pole position; races in italics indicate fastest lap)

Complete FIA Formula 3 Championship results
(key) (Races in bold indicate pole position; races in italics indicate points for the fastest lap of top ten finishers)

† Driver did not finish the race, but was classified as they completed more than 90% of the race distance.

Complete Macau Grand Prix results

Complete Deutsche Tourenwagen Masters results
(key) (Races in bold indicate pole position) (Races in italics indicate fastest lap)

References

External links
 

2001 births
Living people
German racing drivers
ADAC Formula 4 drivers
Euroformula Open Championship drivers
FIA Formula 3 Championship drivers
MRF Challenge Formula 2000 Championship drivers
Formula Regional European Championship drivers
F3 Asian Championship drivers
David
Charouz Racing System drivers
RP Motorsport drivers
US Racing drivers
Pinnacle Motorsport drivers
Campos Racing drivers
Carlin racing drivers
Trident Racing drivers
Deutsche Tourenwagen Masters drivers
Mercedes-AMG Motorsport drivers
Karting World Championship drivers
UAE F4 Championship drivers